Erwin Albeiro Carrillo Fragozo (born June 25, 1983) is a Colombian professional footballer who plays for LDU Loja as a striker. He is known as "a powerful, no-nonsense striker.

In January 2010 arrived to the Chilean football club Everton. He has also played for Deportivo Cali, Unión Magdalena, Once Caldas, Junior and Patriotas. During 2014 season, Carrillo was the top scorer for the second division football league in Colombia representing Unión Magdalena with 19 goals.

Kelantan

In 2015, Carrillo signed with Malaysia Super League club Kelantan. During the interview with local newspaper, he said no reason as to why he would not be able to shine for his team this season despite not being fluent in English and Malay. On February 7, he scored one goal during his debut against ATM that end up his team won 2-0.

International career
He played with the Colombian U-20 national team at the 2003 FIFA World Youth Championship in UAE, helping Colombia finish third by beating Argentina 2-1.

References

External links
 BDFA profile

1983 births
Living people
Colombian footballers
Colombia under-20 international footballers
Categoría Primera A players
Categoría Primera B players
Peruvian Primera División players
Malaysia Premier League players
Deportivo Cali footballers
Unión Magdalena footballers
Once Caldas footballers
Atlético Junior footballers
Patriotas Boyacá footballers
Atlético Huila footballers
FBC Melgar footballers
Kelantan FA players
Everton de Viña del Mar footballers
Real Cartagena footballers
Cúcuta Deportivo footballers
L.D.U. Loja footballers
Colombian expatriate footballers
Colombian expatriate sportspeople in Chile
Colombian expatriate sportspeople in Peru
Colombian expatriate sportspeople in Malaysia
Expatriate footballers in Chile
Expatriate footballers in Peru
Expatriate footballers in Malaysia
Association football forwards
People from Santa Marta
Sportspeople from Magdalena Department